Polinów  is a village in the administrative district of Gmina Janów Podlaski, within Biała Podlaska County, Lublin Voivodeship, in eastern Poland, close to the border with Belarus.

The village has an approximate population of 100.

References

Villages in Biała Podlaska County